Paramusonius is a genus of longhorn beetles of the subfamily Lamiinae.

 Paramusonius affinis Breuning, 1980
 Paramusonius peyrierasi Breuning, 1980

References

Crossotini
Taxa named by Stephan von Breuning (entomologist)